Fergusson Glacier is a tributary glacier that flows northeast between Serba Peak and Feeney Ridge into Noll Glacier, in the Wilson Hills of Antarctica. It was named by the northern party of the New Zealand Geological Survey Antarctic Expedition, 1963–64, after Sir Bernard Fergusson, Governor-General of New Zealand, who made a flight over the party during his visit to Antarctica.

References 

Glaciers of Oates Land